Lobb is a surname of English origin. People with this surname include:

 Arthur Lobb (1871–1928), politician in Manitoba, Canada
 Ben Lobb (born 1976), Canadian politician from Huron—Bruce
 Bryan Lobb (1931–2000), British cricketer
 Dan Lobb (born 1972), British television sports presenter
 John Lobb (c.1866), founder of the company John Lobb Bootmaker
 Ken Lobb (born 1960), U.S. video game designer
 Stephen Lobb (1647–1699), English nonconformist minister and controversialist
 Thomas Lobb (1817–1894), British botanist (brother of William Lobb)
 William Lobb (1809–1864), British botanist (brother of Thomas Lobb)
 Dion Lobb (born 1980), New Zealand former cricketer
 Emmanuel Lobb (1594–1671), English Jesuit and dramatist
 Les Lobb (1894–1970)
 Rory Lobb (born 1995), professional Australian rules footballer
 Theophilus Lobb (1678–1763), English physician
 Olinthus Lobb

Other
Lobb, Kentucky

See also 
 Lob (disambiguation)